Nebria pulcherrima is a species of beetle in the family Carabidae found in Chinese province of Jiangxi and Japan. Subspecies Nebria pulcherrima pulcherrima is found in the same countries.

References

pulcherrima
Beetles described in 1873
Beetles of Asia